Daewon Foreign Language High School (also known as Daewon, Daewon FLHS, or DFLHS; Hangeul: 대원외국어고등학교, 대원외고; Hanja: 大元外國語高等學校) is a private preparatory school located in Seoul, South Korea.

Students choose one primary language as a major from Chinese, French, Japanese, Spanish, or German to study during their three years at the school. Korean and English are mandatory subjects, regardless of which focus language students choose when entering the school. There does exist, however, an English department with sub majors in Japanese  and Chinese.

Like most schools in Korea, Daewon starts its school year in March, starts its second semester in August, and ends the school year in February. There is a weeklong spring break in mid-February.

Daewon is one of the four schools run by the Daewon Education Foundation, all of which share a campus in Junggok-dong, Gwangjin-gu, Seoul.

The school's primary language of instruction is Korean.

History

Origins 

Daewon was founded in 1984 by Dr. Lee Won Hee, then an executive director at Samsung subsidiary Cheil Jedang. Lee had submitted plans for a private foreign language school to the government in 1982, beginning construction of the prospective school's campus expecting the charter to be approved. But when the Ministry of Education rejected his proposal, Daewon Girls' High School was established to take the place of the language school. The following year, however, Daewon's charter was approved, along with that of Daeil Foreign Language High School, and in 1984, the two opened their doors as the first two foreign language high schools in Korea.

Admissions 
In 2011, Daewon put into effect an entirely new admissions procedure that effectively superseded the admissions examination. The change was mandated by a government directive that required all Special Purpose High Schools to select students based on a uniform two-step procedure that involved middle school English subject scores and a brief interview. The new system eliminated the English listening examination that had been the centerpiece of the previous admissions system, in addition to forbidding the school from considering students based on scores from other subjects or extracurricular achievements. This change followed another government mandate, which had in 2010 limited the area from which the school could receive applications to within the bounds of Seoul.

These mandates were part of President Lee Myung-bak's education policy, which aimed to expand access to specialized secondary education. The policy has met with mixed results and reactions: while more students from financially challenged families could enter Daewon under the new quota system, the new system has also been widely criticized for being unable to accurately assess applicants' language abilities, since it is blind to certified language tests such as the TOEFL examination.

Academics

Academic tracks 
There are two academic tracks at Daewon FLHS, the Korean curriculum ("domestic") track and the Global Leadership Program ("international") track. Students are required to choose between the two upon application, but track transfers are permitted, though rare. In accordance with government mandates, the two tracks are now integrated, meaning that track divisions do not fall on department lines. The class of 2013 was the last class to be divided strictly upon track lines, with international track students forming the English department and domestic track students comprising the other language departments at Daewon. In 2015, the domestic-international track ratio is approximately 20:1.

Korean curriculum track 
The majority of the school's students are enrolled in the Korean curriculum track, where they prepare for entrance into Korea's top universities, such as Seoul National University, Yonsei University and Korea University. Preparation involves rigorous cramming for the CSAT examination, as well as training for the nonsul examination, a written examination similar to the SAT's essay section. As Korean universities strengthen their emphasis on extracurricular activities and extracurricular academic achievement, domestic track students are beginning to emulate their peers in the Global Leadership Program (GLP), engaging in various club activities and preparing for Advanced Placement examinations.

Global Leadership Program (GLP) 
Daewon FLHS hosts the Global Leadership Program (GLP), a special academic block scheduling course intended to prepare students for colleges abroad. GLP courses are centered on critical and academic use of the English language, with classes such as English Literature and English Composition.

Since the first class of 2000, many GLP graduates have matriculated at US colleges and universities.

Notable alumni 
Do Kwon, cryptocurrency developer
BIG Naughty, rapper
Ryu So-yeon, professional golfer

References 

High schools in Seoul
Gwangjin District
Educational institutions established in 1984
Private schools in South Korea
Language high schools in South Korea
1984 establishments in South Korea